Kareem Olanrewaju Kazeem (born 21 May 1988) is a Nigerian former footballer who played as a midfielder.

Club career
Born in Lagos, Kazeem signed with Premier League club Fulham as a youngster. He was limited to reserve team football during his spell in England, and subsequently moved to Portugal where he would remain for the vast majority of his career.

In the 2007 off-season, Kazeem joined S.C. Braga who loaned him immediately to C.D. Trofense. He appeared regularly for the latter side, as they achieved a first-ever promotion to the Primeira Liga.

For 2008–09, Kazeem would be loaned again, also in the Segunda Liga, spending the season with Gil Vicente FC. In the following campaign, more of the same – still as a Braga player – now with C.F. Oliveira do Douro in the fourth division.

After cutting ties at the Estádio Municipal de Braga, Kazeem continued playing in the Portuguese lower leagues, first with Sport Benfica e Castelo Branco then Vilaverdense F.C. and Leça FC. He then took his game to Wales, signing with Lliswerry in 2014 and moving to Monmouth Town the following year.

References

External links

1989 births
Living people
Sportspeople from Lagos
Nigerian footballers
Association football midfielders
Fulham F.C. players
Liga Portugal 2 players
Segunda Divisão players
S.C. Braga players
C.D. Trofense players
Gil Vicente F.C. players
Sport Benfica e Castelo Branco players
Vilaverdense F.C. players
Leça F.C. players
Monmouth Town F.C. players
Nigerian expatriate footballers
Expatriate footballers in England
Expatriate footballers in Portugal
Expatriate footballers in Wales
Nigerian expatriate sportspeople in England
Nigerian expatriate sportspeople in Portugal
Nigerian expatriate sportspeople in Wales
21st-century Nigerian people